Dermot McGlinchey (born 9 May 1973) is a former professional snooker player from Northern Ireland. He qualified for the 2010–2011 professional Main Tour by topping the Northern Ireland rankings.

McGlinchey won the Northern Ireland Championship in 2006 and 2010.

External links
 Profile on Pro Snooker

Living people
Snooker players from Northern Ireland
1973 births